"Ain't Easy" is a song recorded by Canadian electropop duo Elijah Woods x Jamie Fine for the first season of the Canadian reality music competition The Launch. The song was written by Ryan Tedder, Zack Skelton, and Camila Cabello, with a new arrangement composed by Woods and Fine, while Tedder produced the track. Following the duo's selection as the winner of the series's second episode, "Ain't Easy" was released to Canadian radio, digital retailers, and music streaming services on January 17, 2018 by Big Machine Records and Universal Music Canada. The song serves as the lead single for the duo's debut EP, 8:47 (2019).

Since its release, "Ain't Easy" has become the most successful single from The Launch, launching at number one on iTunes and being certified Platinum by Music Canada.

Recording
"Ain't Easy" was recorded in the fall of 2017 as part of the competition on The Launch by both the duo of Elijah Woods and Jamie Fine and the soloist Basil Phoenix. The duo created their own arrangement of the song, which was merged with elements of the original for the final recording. Fine performs lead vocals on the track with Woods accompanying on piano. Scott Borchetta described hearing the duo's version of "Ain't Easy" as being "like an out-of-body experience," contributing to the duo's victory.

Commercial performance
Following the song's release, "Ain't Easy" hit number one on the Canadian iTunes sales chart, displacing co-writer Cabello's "Havana". The song debuted at number 14 on the Canadian Digital Song Sales chart dated January 27, 2018. The following week, "Ain't Easy" debuted at number 40 on the Canadian Hot 100. The song reached its peak position of 38 on the chart dated April 7, 2018. It remains the only single generated by the series to appear on the chart. "Ain't Easy" has reached the top 10 on multiple pop airplay charts, peaking at positions of 1, 6, and 5 on the Canada AC, Canada CHR/Top 40, and Canada Hot AC charts, respectively.

Charts

Weekly charts

Year-end charts

Certifications and sales

Release history

References

2018 songs
2018 singles
Big Machine Records singles
Universal Music Group singles
Song recordings produced by Ryan Tedder
Songs written by Ryan Tedder
Songs written by Camila Cabello
Songs written by Zach Skelton